Demondre J. Harvey (born February 19, 1993) is an American professional basketball player for Indios de San Francisco of the Dominican Republic League.

Professional career
Harvey signed his first professional contract with Oulun NMKY of the Finnish Basketball League. On December 4, 2016, Harvey scored a career-high 26 points and grabbed a career-high 19 rebounds in a 85–74 win over Lahti. On August 31, 2019, Harvey signed with the Dominican Republic team, Indios de San Francisco.

References

External links
Demondre Harvey Profile at eurobasket.com

1993 births
Living people
American expatriate basketball people in Argentina
American expatriate basketball people in the Dominican Republic
American expatriate basketball people in Finland
American men's basketball players
Basketball players from Louisiana
Power forwards (basketball)